Dead Calm is a 1989 Australian psychological thriller film directed by Phillip Noyce and starring Sam Neill, Nicole Kidman and Billy Zane. The screenplay by Terry Hayes was based on the 1963 novel of the same name by Charles Williams. Filmed around the Great Barrier Reef, the plot focuses on a married couple, who, after tragically losing their son, are spending some time isolated at sea, when they come across a stranger who has abandoned a sinking ship. 

Notably, the movie is the first successful film adaptation of the novel, after Orson Welles worked for a number of years to complete his own film based on it titled The Deep, though it ultimately went unreleased and uncompleted. Dead Calm was generally well received, with critics praising Neill, Kidman, and Zane's performances and the oceanic cinematography, although some film critics criticized elements of the script for being what they viewed as sensationalization and an over-the-top ending; a critique directed at Warner Brothers who had requested that it be re-shot to provide a less ambiguous resolution for one of the characters. Modern retrospective analysis, assess the film more favorably with The New York Times naming it one of the 1000 best films ever made.

Plot
Rae Ingram (Nicole Kidman) is involved in a car crash which results in the death of her son. Her older husband, Royal Australian Navy officer John Ingram (Sam Neill), suggests that they help deal with their grief by heading out for a vacation alone on their yacht. In the middle of the Pacific, they encounter a drifting schooner that seems to be taking on water. A man, Hughie Warriner (Billy Zane), rows over to the Ingrams' yacht for help. He claims that his ship is sinking and that his companions have all died of food poisoning.

Suspicious of Hughie's story, John rows over to the other ship, instructing Rae to assemble and load the ship's shotgun, though she ignores this. Inside, John discovers the mangled corpses of the other passengers and video footage indicating that Hughie may have murdered them in a feat of extraordinary violence. John rushes back to his own boat, but he's too late as Hughie awakes, knocks out Rae and sails their yacht away, leaving John behind.

As John attempts to keep Hughie's ship from sinking and catch up with them, Rae awakens and tries to convince Hughie to go back for her husband. Hughie denies her request and keeps on sailing, alternating between kindness and bouts of rage. John manages to get through to his wife on the radio, but the water damage makes him unable to reply save for clicks on his ship's radio receiver. He can respond only yes or no to her questions. John assures her that he is following close by. Rae tries to stall the yacht by turning off the engine and tossing the keys overboard. Her dog jumps in to retrieve the keys and brings them back as he had done earlier with his fetch ball. Hughie starts the yacht back up and tries to convince Rae to be friends with him. Rae accepts, attempting to earn his trust. After a while, she goes back to the radar room to contact John. A blip appears on the edge of the radar's range, signifying the damaged boat. She soon learns that it is too far gone and will sink in the next several hours. With John unable to come to her rescue, Rae assures her husband that she will come back for him. John's radio shorts before Rae has a chance to tell him that she loves him. Unable to make further contact with him, Rae breaks down and cries.

Hughie comes down to see Rae sobbing, and heads over to soothe her. Rae formulates a plan to seduce Hughie and gain his trust long enough for her to get to the shotgun on deck. She and Hughie start to make out and undress on the floor. Rae stalls for time by telling him that she has to go to the bathroom. She runs on deck to assemble the shotgun, but Ben the dog follows her. Before she has a chance to load the gun, the dog starts barking causing Hughie to go investigate. In a panic, Rae leaves the gun behind and takes cigarettes down with her as an excuse for being on deck. She eases his suspicion by taking him to the bedroom where she buys herself more time by letting him have sex with her. Later, Rae fixes some lemonade, and places a heavy dose of her prescription sedatives into Hughie's drink after noticing the bottle on the counter. Claiming to go get dressed, Rae heads back for the shotgun, and is discovered soon after. As a fierce storm approaches, Rae and Hughie come to blows. Hughie takes hold of the shotgun, but the effects of the sedative cause him to aim poorly and shoot the radio by mistake. Rae eventually takes hold of a harpoon gun and locks herself in the bedroom. As the door opens she fires off a harpoon. Seeing blood she pushes it open, only to discover she killed her dog. Hughie comes out of hiding to strangle her, but passes out from the drugs. Rae ties him up and sails back to rescue John. Hughie recovers consciousness and cuts himself free with a shard of broken mirror, but after making his way to Rae, she shoots him in the shoulder with a harpoon and knocks him unconscious. She then sets him adrift in the yacht's life raft and continues to look for her husband.

Meanwhile, the damage and the storm have caused the schooner to sink almost completely. The storm intensifies and breaks the ship's main mast, trapping John below deck. The water rises and eventually he is submerged over his head, able to breathe only through a piece of pipe leading to the deck. The only way he can go is down into the schooner's hull, in search of an opening. He takes one last breath from the pipe and dives. Through a gaping hole in the bottom of the hull, John emerges back on the surface. He sets the wreck on fire to signal his location to Rae, who is now desperate to find him. Dusk sets in as Rae notices the flames and sets course to the faint fire on the horizon. Without any means to signal his wife, all John can do is wait on a piece of floating debris. After night falls, the pair reunite when Rae arrives and pulls John aboard.

Later they find the life raft and Rae shoots it with a flare, setting it on fire. The next day they are relaxing on deck when John takes a break from washing Rae's hair to prepare breakfast for her. Her eyes closed, Rae feels a pair of hands begin massaging her scalp and assumes it is John, but when she opens her eyes she sees a bloody Hughie, who begins to strangle her. While Rae struggles, John arrives from below deck. Seeing Rae being attacked, John shoots Hughie in the mouth with a flare, killing him instantly.

Cast
 Sam Neill as Captain John Ingram, R.A.N.
 Nicole Kidman as Rae Ingram
 Billy Zane as Hughie Warriner

Production
The movie is based on the novel Dead Calm by Charles Williams, of which Orson Welles had started filming an adaptation starring himself, Jeanne Moreau and Laurence Harvey titled The Deep in the late 1960s but never completed. Producer Tony Bill had tried to buy the rights from Welles but was never successful. He mentioned this to Phil Noyce, giving him a copy of the book in 1984. Noyce enjoyed the book and showed it to George Miller and Terry Hayes, who were enthusiastic. Miller managed to persuade Oja Kodar, Welles' companion who controlled the rights to the novel, to sell the book to Kennedy Miller.

The book features several other main characters (including Hughie's wife and survivors John finds on the Orpheus), and presented Hughie as a nominally asexual manchild. It also goes into further detail about what caused Hughie's psychotic break.

The movie was filmed over a 6 month span in Queensland's Whitsunday Islands beginning in May 1987. George Miller directed some sequences himself, including one where Sam Neill's character is tormented in the boat by a shark. This scene ended up being dropped from the final film. The sequence in which John kills Hughie with a flare was filmed at the request of Warner Bros seven months after principal photography finished. As written, the film originally ended with Rae setting Hughie adrift on a life raft to ostensibly die at sea; the studio was unhappy with this ambiguity and wanted a definite fate for the film's antagonist.

Reception

Critical reception
Dead Calm has an 83% "fresh" rating at Rotten Tomatoes based on 30 reviews, albeit significantly lower with audiences, culminating in a score of 63% "fresh" and a critical rating of 7.5/10. On Metacritic, the film has a weighted average score of 70 out of 100, based on 16 critics, indicating "generally favorable reviews". Audiences polled by CinemaScore gave the film an average grade of "B" on an A+ to F scale.

According to David Stratton of Variety, "throughout the film, Nicole Kidman is excellent" and "she gives the character of Rae real tenacity and energy" and "though not always entirely credible" the picture "is a nail-biting suspense pic, handsomely produced and inventively directed." Roger Ebert of the Chicago Sun-Times wrote that the film "generates genuine tension." Desson Howe of The Washington Post praised the film's creators: "Noyce's direction moves impressively from sensual tenderness (between husband and wife) to edge-of-the-seat horror. With accomplished editing by Richard Francis-Bruce and scoring by Graeme Revell, he finds lurking dangers in quiet, peaceful waters."

On the other hand, Caryn James of The New York Times felt that the film was "an unsettling hybrid of escapist suspense and the kind of pure trash that depends on dead babies and murdered dogs for effect," and that Dead Calm "becomes disturbing for all the wrong reasons." A number of critics faulted the film's ending as being over-the-top, with the Posts Howe writing, "... while it's afloat, 'Dead Calm' is a majestic horror cruise. ... For much of the movie, you're enthralled. By the end, you're laughing."

The acting was generally considered excellent, with Zane being cited for injecting "unforgettable humanity and evil puckishness into his role" and being "suitably manic and evil." And while Rita Kempley of The Washington Post wrote "what's most fascinating about it is Rae's place in the pantheon of heroines, an Amazon for the '90s," the Times''' James called Kidman's character "tough but stupid."

The film is listed on The New York Times Top 1000 Movies list, derived from editor Peter M. Nichols' The New York Times Guide to the Best 1,000 Movies Ever Made (St. Martin's Griffin, 2004).

The film was partly the inspiration for 1993 Hindi-language film Darr.

Box officeDead Calm'' grossed $2,444,407 at the box office in Australia, which is equivalent to $4,253,268 in 2009 dollars. It grossed $7,825,009 in the U.S.

See also
 The Deep (unfinished film)
 Cinema of Australia

References

External links

 
Dead Calm at Oz Movies
 
 Dead Calm at the National Film and Sound Archive

1989 films
1980s psychological thriller films
1989 thriller films
Australian thriller films
Films scored by Graeme Revell
Films about survivors of seafaring accidents or incidents
Films based on American novels
Films based on thriller novels
Films directed by Phillip Noyce
Films set in Australia
Films set in the Pacific Ocean
Films shot in Queensland
Seafaring films
Warner Bros. films
Films produced by Doug Mitchell
Films produced by George Miller
Films set on boats
1980s English-language films